Sukhov 1-y is a rural locality (a khutor) in Mikhaylovka Urban Okrug, Volgograd Oblast, Russia. The population was 158 as of 2010. There are 12 streets.

Geography 
Sukhov 1-y is located 29 km southeast of Mikhaylovka. Abramov is the nearest rural locality.

References 

Rural localities in Mikhaylovka urban okrug